Zoé Metthez (born 12 December 1994) is a Swiss model and beauty pageant titleholder who was crowned Miss Universe Switzerland 2014 and represented Switzerland at the Miss Universe 2014.

Early life
Zoé holds a commercial diploma from the Jean Piaget École Supérieur de Commerce in  Neuchâtel.

Pageantry

Miss Neuchâtel 2013
Zoé was elected runner-up at Miss Neuchâtel 2013.

Miss Schweiz 2014
On August 17, 2014, Metthez was elected as Miss Universe Switzerland 2014.

Miss Universe 2014
Zoé competed at Miss Universe 2014 pageant but unplaced.

References

External links
Official Miss Universe Switzerland website
Official Miss Universe Switzerland facebook
Zoé's fashion blog

1994 births
Living people
Swiss beauty pageant winners
Miss Universe 2014 contestants